Nickerleola is a genus of beetles in the family Buprestidae, containing the following species:

 Nickerleola camerunica (Obenberger, 1928)
 Nickerleola isabellae (Obenberger, 1921)
 Nickerleola maculigera Obenberger, 1923
 Nickerleola mashuna Obenberger, 1931
 Nickerleola raffrayi (Thery, 1930)
 Nickerleola wittei (Thery, 1948)

References

Buprestidae genera